Xenoplectus is a monotypic genus of South American liocranid sac spiders containing the single species, Xenoplectus armatus. It was first described by R. D. Schiapelli & B. S. Gerschman de P. in 1958, and has only been found in Argentina.

References

Gnaphosidae
Monotypic Araneomorphae genera
Spiders of Argentina